Harry Eggert Holmqvist (26 August 1907 – 11 April 2005) was a middle-distance runner from Sweden. He reached the 3000 m steeplechase final at the 1936 Summer Olympics, but did not finish the race.

References

1907 births
2005 deaths
Swedish male steeplechase runners
Olympic athletes of Sweden
Athletes (track and field) at the 1936 Summer Olympics
Athletes from Stockholm